Hendrik Hansen (born 4 November 1994) is a German footballer who plays as a centre-back for SSV Ulm 1846.

Career
In July 2017, Hansen left his hometown club VfL Wolfsburg after 15 years, and joined 3. Liga side Würzburger Kickers on a two-year deal. 

On 25 January 2022, SSV Ulm 1846 announced that they had signed Hansen on a six-month contract.

References

External links
 

1994 births
Living people
People from Wolfsburg
Footballers from Lower Saxony
German footballers
Germany youth international footballers
Association football defenders
VfL Wolfsburg II players
VfL Wolfsburg players
Würzburger Kickers players
SSV Ulm 1846 players
Bundesliga players
3. Liga players
Regionalliga players
2. Bundesliga players